The Negombo Municipal Council is the local council for Negombo, the largest city in Gampaha district. The council was established under the Municipalities Ordinance of 1878 as a Local Board of Negombo and Gate Mudaliyar A. E. Rajapakse was the first Chairmen of the Urban District Council in 1922. In 1950 the council become Municipal Council and it held first meeting on 1 January 1950.

Representation 
The Negombo Municipal Council is divided into 29 wards and is represented by 26 councillors, elected using an open list proportional representation system.

2011 Local government election 
Results of the local government election held on 8 October 2011.

The Negombo Municipal Council has five standing committees each headed by committee chairman. The standing committees are Finance, Industry and Works, Health and Development, Education and Welfare, Sports and Youth Affairs.

External links 
Negombo Municipal Council

References 

Negombo
Local authorities in Western Province, Sri Lanka
Municipal councils of Sri Lanka